The 1927 Ole Miss Rebels football team represented the University of Mississippi during the 1927 Southern Conference football season. Ole Miss won the first Egg Bowl with a trophy in 1927, led by players Sollie Cohen and V. K. Smith. The team was captained by Ap Applewhite

Schedule

Roster
T Thad Vann, Jr.

References

Ole Miss
Ole Miss Rebels football seasons
Ole Miss Rebels football